Anthony Jude Joseph Buck (29 December 1936 – 15 November 2021) was a British wrestler.

Wrestling career
Buck competed for England in the 1962 British Empire and Commonwealth Games in Perth, Western Australia where he won a gold medal in the light-heavyweight competition.

He also competed, for Great Britain, in the 1964 Olympics in Tokyo. Buck was a doorman at Liverpool's Cavern Club during the time the Beatles performed there in the 1960s.

References

1936 births
2021 deaths
Wrestlers at the 1964 Summer Olympics
British male sport wrestlers
Wrestlers at the 1962 British Empire and Commonwealth Games
Commonwealth Games gold medallists for England
Olympic wrestlers of Great Britain
Commonwealth Games medallists in wrestling
Medallists at the 1962 British Empire and Commonwealth Games